Richmond Mountain is a mountain located in the Catskill Mountains of New York east-northeast of Hunter. Richtmyer Peak is located northeast, Bump Mountain is located south, Steenburg Mountain is located north, and Ashland Pinnacle is located west-southwest of Richmond Mountain.

References

Mountains of Greene County, New York
Mountains of New York (state)
Mountains of Schoharie County, New York